In rational homotopy theory, the Halperin conjecture concerns the Serre spectral sequence of certain fibrations. It is named after the Canadian mathematician Stephen Halperin.

Statement 

Status 
As of 2019, Halperin's conjecture is still open. Gregory Lupton has reformulated the conjecture in terms of formality relations.

Notes

References 

Homotopy theory
Spectral sequences
Conjectures